Bilang Na ang Araw Mo is a 1996 Philippine action film co-written and directed by Toto Natividad. The film stars Cesar Montano, Charlene Gonzales, Rustom Padilla and Dennis Roldan. The film earned ₱6 million during its first day, making it the first biggest opening grosser of Neo Films.

The film is streaming online on YouTube.

Cast
 Cesar Montano as Guiller
 Rustom Padilla as Martin
 Charlene Gonzales as Cathy
 Dennis Roldan as Rodel
 Willie Revillame as Dick
 Daniel Fernando as Andy
 Ricardo Cepeda as Bryan Montes
 Anthony Castelo as Gordon
 Subas Herrero as Don Esteban
 Shintaro Valdez as Cathy's Brother
 Tony Mabesa as Sen. Cepeda
 Brando Legaspi as Junior
 Rommel Montano as Nestor
 Michelle Parton as Joan
 Roy de Guzman as Brando

Production
The film had a working title Utang ng Katawan, Kaluluwa ang Kabayaran. Ina Raymundo was originally cast in the film, but backed out due to scheduling conflicts and was replaced by Charlene Gonzales. Principal photography for the film began while Cesar Montano was halfway done with shooting for Utol, which is also directed by Toto Natividad for Star Cinema.

References

External links

Full Movie on Viva Films

1996 films
1996 action films
Filipino-language films
Philippine action films
Neo Films films
Films directed by Toto Natividad